Sirri Island, is an island in the Persian Gulf belonging to Iran.

The island is one of six in the Abu Musâ Island Group (and is part of Hormozgan province). 
Like the other islands in the Persian Gulf it enjoys a warm and humid climate.

Sirri Island is the location of an oil platform that was once destroyed by the naval forces of the United States during Operation Praying Mantis on April 18, 1988. The platform was reconstructed later, after the war. The Sirri District includes the Sivand and Dena Oil Fields, Nosrat Oil Field, Alvand Oil Field and the Esfand Oil Field along with the Nasr offshore oil platforms. The airport located on the island (Sirri Airport (SXI)) is uncontrolled with a single  runway though Iranian military planes have been seen there.

Another project plans for the renovation of the crude oil export facilities and construction of two large crude oil storage tanks, each with  capacity, on the island is also planned.

Climate
Sirri Island has a hot desert climate (Köppen climate classification BWh).

In the summer, Sirri Island sees some of the highest average dew points of any place in the world, averaging above  in July and August. As a result, heat indices generally top  for most days during the summer. This immense humidity causes summer diurnal ranges to be lower than in normal desert climates, and is a result of air flow from the warm waters of the Persian Gulf.

See also

List of lighthouses in Iran
List of islands of Iran
Hormozgān

References

Gitashenasi Province Atlas of Iran''

Islands of Iran
Landforms of Hormozgan Province
Lighthouses in Iran